The East Molokai Volcano, sometimes also known as Wailau for the Wailau valley on its north side, is an extinct shield volcano comprising the eastern two-thirds of the island of Molokai in the U.S. state of Hawaii.

Description
It is overlapped by the West Molokai, Lanai and Haleakalā shield volcanoes. Its shield formation began two million years ago and ended 1.5 million years ago whereas its postshield eruptions occurred 1.5 to 1.3 million years ago. The pahoehoe shield volcano of the Kalaupapa Peninsula postdates the main shield volcano of East Molokai and is considered to represent the last volcanic phase of East Molokai.

East Molokai was one of the seven principal volcanoes, along with West Molokai, Lānai, West Maui, East Maui, Penguin Bank and Kahoolawe, that formerly constituted the island of Maui Nui.

The Pēpēōpae bog is just below the rim.

The northern flank of the volcano has been truncated by enormous cliffs rising  from the sea. The sea cliffs were formed when the northern third of the East Molokai Volcano suddenly collapsed and slid off into the sea, about 1.4 million years ago.  The landslide was so fast and powerful that it extended  into the sea, and generated a -high megatsunami that inundated the rest of Molokai and severely damaged the surrounding Hawaiian Islands before eventually reaching the coastlines of California and Mexico.

See also
 Kalaupapa, Hawaii

References

External links  

Volcanoes of Maui Nui
Landforms of Molokai
Geography of Kalawao County, Hawaii
Geography of Maui County, Hawaii
Shield volcanoes of the United States
Hawaiian–Emperor seamount chain
Polygenetic shield volcanoes
Extinct volcanoes
Hotspot volcanoes
Pleistocene shield volcanoes
Pleistocene Oceania
Cenozoic Hawaii